Flyvarjávri is a body of water 13 kilometers south of Kautokeino in Norway. The water is right next to the E45. Directly translated from the Sámi language to English the meaning of the name is "the plane water". The body of water got this name after a German reconnaissance aircraft of the type Focke-Wulf Fw 189 A "Uho" crashed on the water on 15 October 1944. The Sámi researcher and author Odd Mathis Hætta has described in the book Samibygder på Finnmarksvidda that as a four-year-old in the autumn of 1944 he observed the plane together with his father when it came flying from the south, low over the village of Siebe. Siebe is 5 kilometers south of Flyvárjavri. The plane went through the ice on the emergency landing, and the German occupation forces machine-gunned the plane before blowing it up when it became clear that it could not be salvaged. There was a crew of two in the plane and both survived. The pilot may have been Lt. Friedrich Drexel. In 1993, the wreck was removed from the accident site and sent to England. Where the plane came from and was on its way to is not known.

References

Bodies of water of Norway